Tony Fry is a design theorist and philosopher who writes on the relationship between design, unsustainability, and politics. Fry has taught design and cultural theory in Britain, the United States, Hong Kong and Australia and holds a PhD in Cultural Studies in Design from the University of Birmingham. Fry has held positions as Adjunct Professor to the Faculty of Design, Architecture and Building at the University of Technology Sydney and as a consultant on sustainable design to the School of the Art Institute of Chicago. He is former Professor and Convenor, Master of Design Futures Program, Griffith University, Queensland College of Art. Fry currently holds visiting an adjunct position at the University of Tasmania, and is visiting professor University of Ibagué (Colombia). He was a contributing editor of Design Philosophy Papers journal and principal of The Studio at the Edge of the World.

Bibliography

 
 Old Worlds, New Visions (1989)
 Green Desires : Ecology, Design, Products (1992)
 RUA/TV? : Heidegger and the Televisual (1993)
 Remakings (1994)
 Waste Not Waste (1996)
 A New Design Philosophy: An Introduction to Defuturing (1999)
 Design Futuring: Sustainability, Ethics, and New Practice (2009)
 
 Design as Politics (2011)
 Becoming Human by Design (2012)
 City Futures in the Age of a Changing Climate (2014)
 Design and the Question of History (2015)
 Remaking Cities: An Introduction to Urban Metrofitting (2017)
 Unstaging War, Confronting Conflict and Peace (2019)

External links 
 The studio at the edge of the world
Design Philosophy Papers
 Design Philosophy Politics
 EcoDesign Foundation (EDF)

Australian designers
Living people
Academic staff of Griffith University
Alumni of the University of Birmingham
Year of birth missing (living people)
Griffith Review people